Studentski grad may refer to:

 Studentski grad, Sofia, a student campus area for most universities in Sofia, Bulgaria
 Studentski Grad, Belgrade, an urban neighborhood of Belgrade, Serbia